A hazard and operability study (HAZOP) is a structured and systematic examination of a complex plan or operation in order to identify and evaluate problems that may represent risks to personnel or equipment. The intention of performing a HAZOP is to review the design to pick up design and engineering issues that may otherwise not have been found. The technique is based on breaking the overall complex design of the process into a number of simpler sections called 'nodes' which are then individually reviewed. It is carried out by a suitably experienced multi-disciplinary team (HAZOP) during a series of meetings.  The HAZOP technique is qualitative, and aims to stimulate the imagination of participants to identify potential hazards and operability problems. Structure and direction are given to the review process by applying standardised guide-word prompts to the review of each node. The relevant international standard calls for team members to display 'intuition and good judgement' and for the meetings to be held in 'a climate of positive thinking and frank discussion'.

The HAZOP technique was initially developed in the 1960s to analyze major chemical process systems but has since been extended to other areas, including mining operations and other types of process systems and other complex systems such as nuclear power plant operation and software development. It is also used as the basis for reviewing batch processes and operating procedures.

Method

The method is applied to complex 'processes' for which sufficient design information is available, and not likely to change significantly. This range of data should be explicitly identified and taken as the ‘design intent’ basis for the HAZOP study.  For example, a prudent designer will have allowed for foreseeable variations within the process creating a larger design envelope than just the basic requirements and the HAZOP will be looking at ways in which this might not be sufficient.

For processes plant, the nodes are chosen so that for each a meaningful design intent  can be specified and they are commonly indicated on piping and instrumentation diagram (P&IDs)  and process flow diagram (PFD). The extent of each node should be appropriate to the complexity of the system and the magnitude of the hazards it might pose. However, it will also need to balance between "too large and complex" (fewer nodes, but the team members may not be able to consider issues within the whole node at once) and "too small and simple" (many trivial and repetitive nodes, each of which has to be reviewed independently and documented).

For each node in turn the HAZOP team uses a list of standardised guide-words and process parameters to identify potential Deviations from the design intent. For each deviation, the team identifies feasible Causes and likely Consequences then decides (with confirmation by subsequent risk analysis where necessary) whether the existing safeguards are sufficient, or whether an Action to install an additional safeguard is necessary to reduce the risks to an acceptable level.

The degree of preparation for the HAZOP is critical to the overall success of the review - 'frozen' design information provided to the team members with time for them to familiarise themselves with the process, an adequate schedule allowed for the performance of the HAZOP, provision of the best team members for their role. Those scheduling a HAZOP should take into account  the review scope, the number of nodes to be reviewed, the provision of completed design drawings and documentation and the need to maintain team performance over an extended time-frame. The team members may also need to perform some of their normal tasks during this period and the HAZOP team members can tend to lose focus unless adequate time is allowed for them to refresh their mental capabilities.

The team meetings should be managed by an independent, trained HAZOP Facilitator who is responsible for the overall quality of the review, partnered with a dedicated Scribe to minute the meetings. "The success of the HAZOP study strongly depends on the alertness and concentration of the team members and it is therefore important that the sessions are of limited duration and that there are appropriate intervals between sessions. How these requirements are achieved is ultimately the responsibility of the study leader."

For a medium-sized chemical plant where the total number of items to be considered is 1200 (items of equipment and pipes or other transfers between them) about 40 such meetings would be needed.  Various software programs are now available to assist in meetings.

Guide words and parameters
In order to identify deviations, the team applies (systematically, in order ) a set of Guide Words to each node in the process.  To prompt discussion, or to ensure completeness, it may also be helpful to explicitly consider appropriate parameters which apply to the design intent.  These are general words such as Flow, Temperature, Pressure, Composition. The current standard notes that Guide Words should be chosen which are appropriate to the study and neither too specific (limiting ideas and discussion) nor  too general (allowing loss of focus). A fairly standard set of Guide Words (given as an example in Table 3 of ) is as follows:

(The last five guide words are applicable to batch or sequential operations.)  Where a guide word is meaningfully applicable to a parameter e.g. NO FLOW, MORE TEMPERATURE, their combination should be recorded as a credible potential deviation (from the design intent) that requires review.

HAZOP-type studies may also be carried out by considering applicable guide words and identifying elements to which they are applicable or by considering  the parameters associated with plant elements and systematically applying guide words to them; although this last approach is not mentioned in the relevant standard, its examples of output include a study (B3) recorded in this way.   The following table gives an overview of commonly used guide word - parameter pairs and common interpretations of them.

  
Once the causes and effects of any potential hazards have been established, the system being studied can then be modified to improve its safety.  The modified design should then be subject to another HAZOP, to ensure that no new problems have been added.  

The technique can also be applied where design information is not fully available and doing so may be useful in eliminating alternative designs, before too much time is invested in them. However, where a design is required to have a HAZOP performed to meet legislative or regulatory requirements, such an 'early' meeting cannot be considered to comply with this requirement.

"The term HAZOP has been often associated, in a generic sense, with some other hazard identification technique.  The use of the term with such techniques is considered to be inappropriate and is  excluded from this document."

Team
A HAZOP study is a team effort.  The team should be as small as possible consistent with their having relevant skills and experience   A minimum team size of 4-5  is recommended. In a large process there will be many HAZOP meetings and the individuals within the team may change as different specialists are required and deputies are required for the various roles.  As many as 20 individuals may be involved but is recommended that the team should not exceed 7-8 at any time (a larger team will make slower progress adding considerably to the costs). Each team member should have a definite role as follows  Note that duplication of roles  (e.g. Client, Contractor & Project Management representatives) should be avoided:

In earlier publications it was suggested that the Study Leader could also be the Recorder but separate roles are now generally recommended.

The use of computers and projector screens can enhance the recording of meeting minutes (the team can see what is minuted and ensure that it is accurate), the display of P&IDs for the team to review, the provision of supplemental documented information to the team and the logging of non-HAZOP issues that may arise during the review, e.g. drawing/document corrections and clarifications. Specialist software is now available from several suppliers to support the recording of meeting minutes and tracking the completion of recommended actions.

History
Although a number of companies were addressing this issue, the technique is generally considered to have originated in the Heavy Organic Chemicals Division of Imperial Chemical Industries (ICI), which was then a major British and international chemical company.  The history has been described by Trevor Kletz who was the company's safety advisor from 1968 to 1982, from which the following is abstracted.

In 1963 a team of 3 people met for 3 days a week for 4 months to study the design of a new phenol plant.  They started with a technique called critical examination which asked for alternatives, but changed this to look for deviations.  The method was further refined within the company, under the name operability studies, and became the third stage of its hazard analysis procedure (the first two being done at the conceptual and specification stages) when the first detailed design was produced.

In 1974 a one-week safety course including this procedure was offered by the Institution of Chemical Engineers (IChemE) at Teesside Polytechnic.  Coming shortly after the Flixborough disaster, the course was fully booked, as were ones in the next few years.  In the same year the first paper in the open literature was also published.  In 1977 the Chemical Industries Association published a guide.  Up to this time the term HAZOP had not been used in formal publications.  The first to do this was Kletz in 1983, with what were essentially the course notes (revised and updated) from the IChemE courses.  By this time, hazard and operability studies had become an expected part of chemical engineering degree courses in the UK.

See also
 Hazard analysis
 Hazard analysis and critical control points
 HAZID
 Process safety management
 Risk assessment
 Safety engineering
 Workplace safety standards

Notes

References

Further reading

Gould, J., (2000) Review of Hazard Identification Techniques, HSE
http://www.uscg.mil/hq/cg5/cg5211/docs/RBDM_Files/PDF/RBDM_Guidelines/Volume%203/Volume%203-Chapter%2010.pdf
Hazard and Operability Studies Explanation by a software supplier

 Potential problems with HAZOPs (authors sell HAZOP expertise, so presumably some promotional intent, but the issues described are genuine/recognisable)
https://www.bureauveritas.co.uk/industrial-risk-management/workshop-facilitation/hazard-and-operability-study-hazop
HAZOP Explained, from Primatech, Inc.
HAZOP Fundamentals a White Paper from Primatech Inc. 2018.

Process safety
Safety
Safety engineering